Jordan Zimmerman (born 1955/56 in Newark, New Jersey) is an advertising business executive and philanthropist who founded the Zimmerman Advertising, based in Fort Lauderdale, Florida, the 14th largest advertising agency in the world if you don't count the big agencies.

Biography
Zimmerman was born in Newark, New Jersey, the oldest of four siblings in a middle-class family. His father manufactured syrups for soft drinks and eventually moved the family to Fort Lauderdale, Florida where Zimmerman graduated high school. In 1978, he graduated with a B.A. in advertising from the University of South Florida and after he was unable to get an advertising job in New York City, returned to USF where he received his MBA in 1980. After school, he returned to Fort Lauderdale and started his own agency focusing on the auto industry. In 1984, he founded Zimmerman Advertising. 
In 1999, his company joined the Omnicom Group and Zimmerman grew his company through acquisitions purchasing Ad Team, Ad Productions, Beacon Worldwide (a marketer of auto products to dealerships), and in 2004, the public relations and hospitality firm Zimmerman Agency (no relation) located in Tallahassee.

He currently sits on the board of trustees at the University of South Florida and Pine Crest School. He is active in the Palm Beach Jewish Federation, Take Stock in Children, and the Florence Fuller Child Development Center.

Zimmerman is a former minority owner of the Florida Panthers; he and his partners, majority owner Cliff Viner, and minority owners H. Wayne Huizenga, Alan Cohen, and Mike Maroone, sold their interests to Vincent Viola and Douglas Cifu for $250 million in 2013.

Personal life
Zimmerman has been married four times. His first wife was Amy B Natiss Paul. His second wife was Melissa B Feldman Zimmerman. His third wife was Denise (née Broadrick) Zimmerman who was raised Roman Catholic but converted to Judaism, the religion of her husband. Zimmerman has four children, Chase, Jordana, Cara, Jett. His fourth wife is Terry Lee Zimmerman. He has homes in Boca Raton, Florida and Westhampton, Long Island, New York.

References 

1950s births
Living people
American advertising executives
People from Newark, New Jersey
University of South Florida alumni